Kim Mi-sook (born March 26, 1959) is a South Korean actress.

Career
Kim Mi-sook made her acting debut in 1979 and has since had a prolific career on television. Recent notable roles include a divorcee making a new start in morning drama Queen's Conditions (2005), and the villainous stepmother in primetime hit Brilliant Legacy (2009). For her much-praised portrayal of the mother of an autistic runner in Marathon (2005), Kim received Best Supporting Actress nominations from the Grand Bell Awards and Korean Film Awards. She was again nominated at the Grand Bell Awards, Blue Dragon Film Awards and Korean Film Awards for her supporting turn in action thriller Seven Days (2007).

Other activities
Kim established 사랑유치원 ("Love Kindergarten") in 1987 and served as its director until 2002. She also co-founded an artist group called "Hyangmihoe", along with Lee Su-chang, Kwon Young-Ho, Yu Si-Won, Park Gi-Tae, Lee Sang-Gil, and others.

Stalker
A woman who had been stalking Kim for 17 years was arrested in 2007.

Filmography

Film

Seven Days (2007) 
Marathon (2005)
A Hilarious Mourning (O-gu) (2003)
I Want to Go (1984)
Milky Way in Blue Sky (1984)
Born on February 30 (1983)
Another's Nest (1982) 
Ardent Love (1982)
Three Women Under the Umbrella (1980)

Television drama

Payback (2023) - Cameo  
Little Women (2022) 
Artificial City (2021)
Beautiful Love, Wonderful Life (2019)
Man in the Kitchen (2017)
Sweet Stranger and Me (2016)
The Flower in Prison (2016)
All About My Mom (2015)
Flower of Queen (2015)
Glorious Day (2014)
Empire of Gold (2013)
Case Number 113 (2013)
Hur Jun, the Original Story (2013) 
Insu, The Queen Mother (jTBC, 2011)
Just Like Today (MBC, 2011)
City Hunter (SBS, 2011)
My Love By My Side (SBS, 2011)
Happiness in the Wind (KBS1, 2010)
Definitely Neighbors (SBS, 2010)
Brilliant Legacy (SBS, 2009)
Don't Cry My Love (MBC, 2008)
Lobbyist (SBS, 2007)
Golden Bride (SBS, 2007)
I'll Go With You (SBS, 2006)
As the River Flows (KBS1, 2006)
Queen's Conditions (SBS, 2005)
The Land (SBS, 2004)
Love Is All Around (MBC, 2004)
Island Village Teacher (SBS, 2004)
Punch (SBS, 2003)
Sweetheart (SBS, 2003)
Outing (SBS, 2001)
Well Known Woman (SBS, 2001)
Blue Mist (KBS2, 2001)
Sad Temptation (KBS2, 1999)
Hug (SBS, 1998)
I Love You! I Love You! (SBS, 1998)
Three Kim Generation (SBS, 1998)
Love (MBC, 1998)
MBC Best Theater "7일간의 선택" (MBC, 1997)
70-minute Dramas "Two Mothers" (SBS, 1997)
산 (MBC,1997)
Power of Love (MBC, 1996)
바다가 넓은 아이들 (SBS, 1996)
Until We Can Love (KBS2, 1996)
Confession (SBS, 1995)
Korea Gate (SBS, 1995)
The Third Republic (MBC, 1993)
서른 한 살의 반란 (KBS2, 1993)
전원일기 (MBC,1993)
To the Lovely Others (SBS, 1993)
Warm River (MBC, 1993)
Wind in the Grass (MBC, 1992)
Women's Time (KBS2, 1991)
땅 (MBC,1991)
가을에 온 손님 (KBS2, 1990)
Dark Sky, Dark Bird (MBC, 1990)
Under the Wool (KBS2, 1989)
The Second Republic (MBC, 1989)
Fetters of Love (KBS2, 1989)
타인 (KBS2, 1987)
Gayo Drama (KBS2, 1987)
Warm River (KBS2, 1986)
Your Portrait (KBS2, 1986)
멀고 먼 사람들 (KBS2, 1986)
Finding Happiness - Episode 2 "Cheer Up, Dad" (KBS2, 1986)
TV Literature "The Jehol Diary" (KBS2, 1985)
TV Literature "The Last Song" (KBS2, 1985)
Silver Rapids (KBS1, 1985)
딸이 더 좋아 (KBS2, 1984)
간호병동 (KBS2, 1984)
Maze (KBS2, 1984)
고교생일기 (KBS1,1983)
A Youth March (KBS1, 1983)
A Water-bearer From Bukcheong (KBS1, 1982)
우둥불 (1982)
The Land of Promises (1982)
우리에게 축복의 기도를 (1981)
TV문학관 - 무진기행 (1981)
물망초 (1981)
무지개 (1981)
동심초 (1980)
Hometown of Legends "상사초" (1980)
Hometown of Legends "Dead Woman" (1979)
Hometown of Legends "Hongsalmun" (1979)
차씨마을 (1979)

Documentary
MBC Special - Naturalist Tasha's Garden (MBC, 2008) - narration

Radio program
Kim Mi-sook's Family Music (KBS 1FM, 2018- )
All the Music in the World with Kim Mi-sook (KBS 1FM, 2002-2007)
This Beautiful Morning with Kim Mi-sook (SBS Power FM, 1996-2000)
Kim Mi-sook's Music Salon (MBC Standard FM, 1990)

Spoken word album
Happy Stories 행복을 숨겨둔 곳 Disc 1 (2002)
Kim Mi-sook's Poetry Readings at Home (1994)
Kim Mi-sook Telling the Fairy Tales of Our Times (1994, parts 1 and 2)
눈물이 시가되어 흐를때 (1990)

Awards and nominations

State honors

Notes

References

External links
 Kim Mi-sook Instagram
 
 
 
 

South Korean television actresses
South Korean film actresses
1959 births
Living people